AGH or Agh may refer to:

 AGH University of Science and Technology
 Ngelima language, ISO-639-3 code
 Agh (trigraph), in orthography
Ängelholm-Helsingborg Airport, Sweden (IATA Airport code AGH)
 Ágh, a surname
 Agh Shani, a white table grape

People
 A.G.H. Hansen

Places
 AgeHa, nightclub in Tokyo, Japan
 Alachua General Hospital, Gainesville, Florida, US hospital renamed to Shands AGH
 Allegheny General Hospital, Pittsburgh, Pennsylvania, US
 Australian General Hospital, various Australian Army medical units in World War I and World War II (no list yet)
 Art Gallery of Hamilton, Ontario, Canada

Iran for village
 Agh Bolagh, various
 Agh Gol
 Āgh Kand
 Agh Qal'eh, various

See also
 AGHS (disambiguation)
 AG (disambiguation)